The Australia women's cricket team played against New Zealand women's cricket team in March and April 2021. The tour took place during the time that was originally scheduled to be used to host the 2021 Women's Cricket World Cup. However, the tournament was postponed by one year due to the COVID-19 pandemic. The fixtures for the tour were confirmed in January 2021, with three Women's Twenty20 International (WT20I) and three Women's One Day International (WODI) being played. The WT20I matches were played as double-headers alongside the men's fixtures between New Zealand and Bangladesh.

Australia won the first WT20I by six wickets, with New Zealand winning the second match by four wickets to level the series. Only 2.5 overs of play was possible in the third WT20I, with the series being drawn 1–1.

Australia won the first WODI by six wickets, setting a new record of twenty-two consecutive wins in ODI cricket. This broke the previous record of twenty-one wins set by Ricky Ponting's team of 2002–03. Australia won the second WODI by 71 runs, winning the series and retaining the Rose Bowl. Australia won the third WODI by 21 runs to win the series 3–0.

Squads

Annabel Sutherland was ruled out of Australia's squad due to injury, with Molly Strano named as her replacement. Sophie Devine was ruled out of the last two WT20Is with Amy Satterthwaite captaining the New Zealand in her place. Molly Penfold was added to New Zealand's squad for third WT20I. Frances Mackay was also ruled out the third WT20I and WODI series with Lauren Down added as cover in the third WT20I. Sophie Devine was also ruled out of the WODI series, with Amy Satterthwaite again named captain of New Zealand in her absence. Kate Anderson was named as Devine's replacement for the WODI matches.

WT20I series

1st WT20I

2nd WT20I

3rd WT20I

WODI series

1st WODI

2nd WODI

3rd WODI

Notes

References

External links
 Series home at ESPN Cricinfo

Australia 2020-21
New Zealand 2020-21
International cricket competitions in 2020–21
2020–21 Australian women's cricket season
2021 in New Zealand cricket
cricket
2021 in women's cricket